A Collection of Romantic Themes is a compilation album by keyboardist Yanni, released on the Private Music label in 1994.

This compilation consists of tracks from his 1992 Grammy-nominated album Dare to Dream and his 1993 follow-up album In My Time as well as from Reflections of Passion and Live at the Acropolis.

This album is no longer in print.

Track listing

Production
 Engineered and mixed by Yanni at his private studios
Mastered at Bernie Grundman Mastering, Los Angeles 
 Produced and Manufactured exclusively for Dayton Hudson. Corporation
 Distributed by BMG Distribution.

(Production as described in CD liner notes.)

References

Yanni albums
1994 compilation albums